Peire Milo, Milon or Millon was a mid-13th-century Italian troubadour. His cobla esparsa "En amor trop pietat gran", he derives the word amor (love) from suffering and death (mor). His only other songs are cansos:
"Aissi m'ave com cel qui seignors dos"
"A vos, merces, voill retrar mon afaire"
"Per pratz vertz ni per amor"
"Pos l'us auzels envas l'autre s'atura"
"Pos que dal cor m'ave, farai chansos"
"Quant hom troba dos bos combatedo"
"S'eu anc d'amor sofers ni mal ni pena"
"Si com lo metge fa crer"

Bibliography
Borghi Cedrini, Luciana. "Osservazioni sulla tradizione manoscritta di Peire Milo", in Atti del XXI Congresso Internazionale di Linguistica e Filologia Romanza (Palermo, 18–24 September 1995), vol. 6, sect. 7 (Tübingen: Niemeyer, 1998 ), pp. 37–45.

13th-century Italian troubadours